Bahor is a village and jamoat in Tajikistan. It is part of the city of Vahdat in Districts of Republican Subordination. The jamoat has a total population of 28,276 (2015).

References

Populated places in Districts of Republican Subordination
Jamoats of Tajikistan